This is a list of films which have placed number one at the box office in Italy during 2001. Amounts are in lire.

References

See also
 Lists of box office number-one films

2001
Italy
Box